Fenerbahçe Ülker is the professional men's basketball department of Fenerbahçe S.K., a major multisport club based in Istanbul, Turkey.

For the season roster: 2008-09 Roster

Regular season
The Regular Season began on October 20, 2008 and concluded on January 15, 2009.

Group C

Top 16
The Top 16 stage was played from January 28 to March 12, 2009.

The draw was conducted on January 19 at Euroleague Basketball (company) headquarters in Barcelona. The group winners in the Regular Season were drawn from one pot, the runners-up from one pot, the teams in 3rd place from one pot and those in 4th place from one pot. Teams that played in the same group in the Regular Season could not meet again in the Top 16. Also, teams from the same country could not be drawn into the same pool unless it was necessary to prevent teams from the same Regular Season group from being drawn together.

Group H

External links
Official Fenerbahçe site 
Fenerbahçe Ulker 
Euro League Page 
TBLStat.net 
Euroleague Format
Euroleague.net
Fenerbahçe fansite 

2008–09
2008–09 Euroleague by club
2008–09 in Turkish basketball by club